Borden Parker Bowne (January 14, 1847 – April 1, 1910) was an American Christian philosopher, Methodist minister and theologian. He was nominated for the Nobel Prize in Literature nine times.

Life
Bowne was born on January 14, 1847, near Leonardville in Monmouth County, New Jersey. In 1876 he became a professor of philosophy at Boston University, where he taught for more than thirty years. He later served as the first dean of the graduate school. Bowne was an acute critic of mechanistic determinism, positivism, and naturalism. He categorized his views as Kantianized Berkeleyanism, transcendental empiricism, and, finally, personalism, emphasizing freedom and the importance of the self, a philosophical branch of liberal theology:  of this branch Bowne is the dominant figure; this personalism is sometimes called Boston personalism, in contrast with the California personalism of George Holmes Howison. Bowne's magnum opus, Metaphysics, was published in 1882. Bowne was  influenced by Hermann Lotze. He died on April 1, 1910, in Boston, Massachusetts.

Legacy

Bowne has influenced philosophy in various ways.  For instance, there has been a direct line of personalists from Bowne through his student, Edgar Sheffield Brightman (1884–1954), through Brightman's student, Peter Anthony Bertocci (1910–1989), to Bertocci's student, Thomas O. Buford (born 1932).

There has also been a more general influence, as with Martin Luther King Jr., who studied at Boston University, and spoke in his Stride Toward Freedom of having gained "a metaphysical basis for the dignity and worth of all human personality."

Bowne received nine nominations for the Nobel Prize in Literature between 1906 and 1909—one from his own sister.

Published works
 The Philosophy of Herbert Spencer (New York, 1874).
 Studies in Theism (New York, 1882).
 Metaphysics: A Study in First Principles (New York, 1882; revised ed., 1898).
 Introduction to Psychological Theory (New York, 1886).
 Philosophy of Theism (New York, 1887; revised ed. 1902).
 The Principles of Ethics (New York, 1892).
 Theory of Thought and Knowledge (New York, 1899).
 The Christian Revelation (Cincinnati, 1898).
 The Christian Life (Cincinnati, 1899).
 The Atonement (Cincinnati, 1900).
 The Immanence of God (Boston, 1905).
 Personalism (Boston, 1908).
 Studies in Christianity (1909).
 A Man’s View of Woman Suffrage (Boston, 1910).
 The Essence of Religion (Boston, 1910).
 Kant and Spencer: A Critical Exposition (Boston, 1912).

See also
 George Holmes Howison
 List of American philosophers
 Max Scheler, the primary figure in German personalism

Notes

References

Footnotes

Bibliography

Further reading

 Auxier, Randall E., ed. (1997). "The Relevance of Borden Parker Bowne" (special issue). The Personalist Forum. 13 (1). . .
 
 
 
 
 
 
 
 
 
 
 
 
 
 
 
 
 
 
 
 

1847 births
1910 deaths
19th-century American philosophers
19th-century Methodist ministers
20th-century American philosophers
20th-century Methodist ministers
American Methodist clergy
Boston University faculty
Members of the Methodist Episcopal Church
Methodist philosophers
Methodist theologians
New York University alumni
Philosophers from Massachusetts
Philosophers from New Jersey